El Condor is a 1970 American Western film directed by John Guillermin.

Jim Brown and Lee Van Cleef lead a band of Apaches (including Iron Eyes Cody) against a fortress commanded by Patrick O'Neal. The fortress is said to contain the gold reserves of Emperor Maximilian.

The movie was shot in 35mm Technicolor in Almería, Spain, and involved the construction of the huge adobe fortress set that was re-used in later films, including Conan the Barbarian (1982) and March or Die (1977).

El Condor was among the first movies rated R (for violence, explicit language, and nudity).

Plot
In 1860s Mexico, Luke, an escaped convict, and Jaroo, a loner gold prospector who is not very bright, team up with a band of Apache Indians to capture a heavily armed fortress for the thousands of gold bars said to be stored within. The fortress is commanded by the sadistic Chavez, whose mistress, Claudine, Luke becomes attracted to the moment he sees her.

Cast

Production
The film was financed by National General, who in October 1968 announced they had purchased Steve Carabatsos' original script and would make the film the following March. Filming was pushed back; in April 1969 National General announced the movie as part of a slate of 13 films they would make, costing $35 million in all. John Guillermin was attached to direct.

The studio had recently made a film called Daddy's Gone A-Hunting based on a script by Larry Cohen. Cohen says the studio decided to make the movie, built a fort and town in Almeria, Spain, then decided they disliked the script; they paid Cohen to travel to Spain and write a new film around the existing sets. Cohen wrote a script they were happy with, and Jim Brown and Lee Van Cleef were cast. According to Cohen, Van Cleef then changed his mind about doing the film on the advice of Alberto Grimaldi who said the actor's character was ridiculous; Cohen persuaded van Cleef to do it, arguing it was a comic role along the lines of Humphrey Bogart's character in The African Queen.

The casting of the two leads was announced in July 1969.

Filming started in October 1969. Swedish actor Ewa Aulin, who had been in Candy was originally meant to play the female lead. However she quit the film, refusing to film nude scenes. She was replaced by Mariana Hill who said she would go nude: "If it's done well".

Cohen says that director John Guillermin and producer Andre de Toth did not get along, in part because the latter wanted to direct. According to Cohen, de Toth took over from the director on his previous movie (Play Dirty) and wanted to do the same thing again. The conflict resulted in Guillermin and de Toth having a fistfight.

VHS and DVD releases
The movie was released on a fullscreen VHS in 1994, and a widescreen DVD by Warner Archive in 2009.

Critical reaction
Roger Ebert's review of August 27, 1970 in the Chicago Sun-Times began: "Lee Van Cleef's last words in El Condor are, 'What am I doing here?' Amen, brother".

See also
 List of American films of 1970

References

Bibliography
 The American Film Institute Catalog of Motion Pictures Produced in the United States – Feature Films, 1961–1970. University of California Press, 1997, page 298.
 Greenspun, Roger, "Screen: `El Condor’ Bows, Mexican Treasure Tale Comes to the Forum", The New York Times, June 20, 1970, page 22.

External links
 
 
 
 
 

1970 films
1970 Western (genre) films
American Western (genre) films
Films directed by John Guillermin
Films scored by Maurice Jarre
Films set in Mexico
Films shot in Almería
Films with screenplays by Larry Cohen
Second French intervention in Mexico films
1970s English-language films
1970s American films